The York Medical Society is a medical society founded in York, England, in 1832. It is located in a grade II* listed building at 23 Stonegate, in York.

Origins
The York Medical Society was founded in 1832, two years before the establishment of York Medical School. The first president, Baldwin Wake, addressed the Society at its first meeting in March 1832.

At the time, they had no permanent premises and met first at the York dispensary, then between October 1856 and May 1874 at Mr Graham's house in Market Town, followed by three years in the Board Room at York County Hospital after Mr Graham's death and then for a brief period between 1877 and 1878 at 9 Ousegate. For the next two years the York Medical Society met at the de Grey Rooms and then until 1915, they rented rooms at 1 Low Ousegate, when they moved to the current location of 23 Stonegate, the previous home of Tempest Anderson and his father W.C. Anderson.

It developed consulting rooms and a dispensary.

In 2003, the library and archive were moved to the Borthwick Institute.

Premises
23 Stonegate is a late 16th-Century house, which incorporates the remains of several earlier structures on the site, and which has been altered and extended at various times in the centuries following its construction. Its 1590 rainwater head is the oldest surviving in York. The building is currently divided into a number of offices and flats as well as serving as the base for the society. It has had associations with the medical profession since at least the early 19th-Century, when it was owned by the Anderson family, and in the later part of the century it was home to the surgeon and vulcanologist Tempest Anderson, whose plaque is still present on the entrance to the building. It was purchased by the York Medical Society in 1944; the dining room, which features a Greek fret and paterae underneath an elaborate cornice, now serves as the society's lecture hall. The building was first listed in 1954, and was upgraded to Grade II* in 1997.

The library
The York Medical Society houses a library consisting of books from its own collection as well as those from the York County Hospital and the York Dispensary.

The York Medical Society oration
The first oration was given by Jonathan Hutchinson in 1890.

In 1909, when Sir William Osler spoke on "The Beginning of Medicine", he was surprised that rather than a purely medical audience, it was diverse and included the Dean of York. At the following banquet, he gave particular mention to some of the Society's well known medical men including Robert Burton and Martin Lister.

Orators in the early years included Sir Clifford Allbutt, Sir Victor Horsley, Sir James Crichton-Browne, Sir German Sims Woodhead, Sir T. Lauder Brunton, Sir George Savage and Sir Norman Moore. In the later years, orators included Parveen Kumar, Graeme Catto, Professor Dame Susan Bailey and Lord Kakkar.

The Society holds the "Declaration of Trusts between the Lecturers in the York School of Medicine, 21 May 1841".

In 1893, Victor Horsley visited the society to give its annual oration.

Exhibitions
In 2015, a selection of Raghu Rai’s work on the Bhopal disaster was exhibited at the Society.

See also
 List of York Medical Society orators

References

External links 

Medical associations based in the United Kingdom
1832 establishments in England
Grade II* listed buildings in York
Organisations based in York
Stonegate (York)